Tamer Husni Omar Soubar (born in 1994) is a Jordanian footballer who plays for Al-Ahli.

International goals

With U-17

References

External links
 

1994 births
Living people
Jordanian footballers
Jordan international footballers
Association football forwards
Sportspeople from Amman
Al-Ahli SC (Amman) players
Shabab Al-Ordon Club players
Al-Jazeera (Jordan) players
Blackburn Rovers F.C. players
Jordanian expatriate footballers
Expatriate footballers in England